Charles Andrew Frye (July 17, 1913 – May 25, 1945) was a pitcher in Major League Baseball who played for the Philadelphia Phillies during the 1940 season.

Born in Hickory, North Carolina, Charlie Frye was one of many baseball players whose professional career was interrupted during World War II.

Frye started in organized baseball in 1937 for Class-D Mooresville (North Carolina State League). He later played for Class-B Evansville (Illinois–Indiana–Iowa League, 1938), returning to Class-D with Snow Hill (Coastal Plain League, 1939) and Martinsville (Bi-State League, 1939–40) before joining the Phillies, appearing for them in July 1940 in a span of fifteen games.

Frye posted a 0–6 record (five starts) and a 4.65 earned run average, allowing 32 runs (26 earned) on 58 hits and 26 walks while striking out 18 in 50 innings of work.

Following his majors stint, Frye returned to minor league action pitching at Class-B for Allentown (1941) and Wilmington (1942) of the Interstate League and the Statesville team (NCSL, 1942) until he went into the Army. In parts of six minor league seasons, he went 42–36 with a 3.86 ERA in 150 pitching appearances.
  
Shortly after being discharged in 1945, Frye died at his home of Hickory, North Carolina at the age of 31.

See also
1940 Philadelphia Phillies season

References

External links

Major League Baseball pitchers
Philadelphia Phillies players
Allentown Wings players
Evansville Bees players
Martinsville Manufacturers players
Mooresville Moors players
Portsmouth Cubs players
Snow Hill Billies players
Statesville Owls players
Wilmington Blue Rocks (1940–1952) players
United States Army personnel of World War II
Baseball players from North Carolina
People from Hickory, North Carolina
1913 births
1945 deaths
United States Army soldiers